Circumdatin H is an alkaloid. It was isolated, along with related compounds, from the fungus Aspergillus ochraceus.

Circumdatin C, and circumdatin F are prototypical members, while other members such as circumdatin D, circumdatin E and circumdatin H have an additional tetrahydropyrrole ring.

The compounds of this group are considered to be useful chemotaxonomic markers. Among these circumdatin H and circumdatin E are able to inhibit the mitochondrial respiratory chain in submitochondrial particles from beef heart, presumable by interfering with NADH oxidase activity (IC50 1.5 μM and 2.5 μM, respectively).

First total synthesis of circumdatin H was reported starting from anthranilic acid.

References

Alkaloids found in fungi